The 6th National People's Congress was in session from 1983 to 1988. It held five sessions in this period.

Elections to the Congress 
This new Congress was the first under the current 1982 Constitution, and the first to be elected under the rules of the 1979 Electoral Law of the PRC.

In keeping with the provisions of the law, all deputies of the 6th NPC were elected indirectly from 1982 to February 1983 by the provincial-level legislatures of:

 All 21 Provinces of China
 All 5 Autonomous regions of China
 The city legislatures of Beijing, Shanghai and Tianjin

Elected state leaders
In the 1st Plenary Session in 1983, the Congress elected the state leaders:
President of the People's Republic of China: Li Xiannian
Chairman of the Standing Committee of the National People's Congress: Peng Zhen
Premier of the State Council: Zhao Ziyang
Chairman of the Central Military Commission: Deng Xiaoping
President of the Supreme People's Court: Zheng Tianxiang
Prosecutor-General of the Supreme People's Procuratorate: Yang Yichen

External links
 Official website of the NPC

National People's Congresses
1983 in China